Constitution Beach is a man-made crescent-shaped, sandy beach located in the Orient Heights (now HarborView) neighborhood of East Boston, Massachusetts.

The easternmost portion of the beach continues to be known to locals as "Shay's Beach."   

The beach underwent renovations in the late 1990s as a new public bathhouse and refreshment stand was added, as well as a new pedestrian walkway over the tracks of the Blue Line onto Bennington Street. The East Boston Greenway was recently connected to the beach by the creation of a multi-use path from Wood Island. 

At that time,  of land was filled in with hydraulically dredged material and gravel to create the beach, which soon after opened to the public in 1952. 

The beach is located in a protected inlet so the water, though part of the Atlantic Ocean, is always relatively placid. There are bathhouse facilities on the beach, as well as a snack bar, a children's playground, handball, basketball, and tennis courts, in addition to baseball fields and an indoor ice rink.

The overpass that was built at the time allowed pedestrians to cross over subway tracks to reach the beach from the busy Bennington Street.  It had begun to deteriorate in the 1990s and was replaced by a new structure.

In April 2021, a woman became stuck in the mud at low tide, and had to be rescued by firefighters.

References

External links
Profile at Boston Central
Profile at Boston Harborwalk

Beaches of Massachusetts
East Boston
Landforms of Boston
Tourist attractions in Boston